Vera Vitalievna Glagoleva (31 January 1956 – 16 August 2017) was a Soviet and Russian actress and film director.

Glagoleva was born in Moscow, Russian SFSR, Soviet Union in 1956. She starred in her first film in 1975 after graduating from high school. She made her directorial debut in 1990. In 2014, on the screens she released her film Two Women, the main role which was performed by Ralph Fiennes. Glagoleva was awarded the People's Artist of Russia in 2011.

Personal life
Glagoleva was first married to actor Rodion Nakhapetov from 1974 to 1988. The couple had two children. Later, she married for the second time to businessman Kirill Shubsky.

Glagoleva died at a hospital in Germany on 16 August 2017 of cancer at the age of 61.

References

External links

 

1956 births
2017 deaths
Deaths from cancer in Germany
People's Artists of Russia
Actresses from Moscow
20th-century Russian actresses
21st-century Russian actresses
Russian film actresses
Soviet film actresses
Honored Artists of the Russian Federation
Russian film directors
Russian women film directors
Russian screenwriters
Russian film producers
Russian women film producers
Deaths from stomach cancer
Burials in Troyekurovskoye Cemetery